A Day in the Stark Corner is the third studio album by the American Dark Wave band Lycia, released on  by Projekt Records.

Recording
Mike VanPortfleet has attributed a lack of quality recording equipment as having a profound effect on Stark Corner's sound.

Reception

Ned Raggett of AllMusic gave it 4 out of 5 stars, describing it as being "a series of similar sounding pieces which work wonderfully as an extended mood setter."

In MK Ultra Issue No. 1, (1995) Peter Steele of Type O Negative said

Track listing

Personnel
Adapted from the A Day in the Stark Corner liner notes.
Lycia
Mike VanPortfleet – vocals, instruments, mixing
Additional musicians and production
Sam Rosenthal – mixing

Release history

References

External links 
 
 A Day in the Stark Corner at Bandcamp
 A Day in the Stark Corner at iTunes

1993 albums
Lycia (band) albums
Projekt Records albums